Nothocalais is a genus of North American flowering plants in the tribe Cichorieae within the family Asteraceae. There are known generally as false dandelions or false agoseris.

 Species
 Nothocalais alpestris - alpine lake false dandelion - CA WA OR 
 Nothocalais cuspidata - prairie false dandelion - ALB SAS MAN MT WY NM ND SD NE KS OK TX MN IA MO IL WI NY
 Nothocalais nigrescens - speckled false dandelion - ID MT WY 
 Nothocalais troximoides - sagebrush false dandelion - BC WA OR CA ID NV UT WY MT

References

External links
 Jepson Manual Treatment
 USDA Plants Profile

 
Flora of North America
Asteraceae genera